Edward Percy Moran (1862–1935), sometimes known as Percy Moran, was an American artist known for his scenes of American history.

Early life
He was born in Philadelphia on July 29, 1862, to Edward Moran, a notable artist who emigrated from England to the United States. He studied under his father and at the Pennsylvania Academy of Fine Arts and the National Academy of Design.

Career 
He was a painter of historical American subjects, and examples of his work are found in many prominent collections.

Personal life 
He died in New York City on March 25, 1935. His brother Leon Moran (born 1864), his uncles Peter Moran (born 1842) and Thomas Moran, and his cousin Jean Leon Gerome Ferris were also prominent American artists.

Images

References

External links

"The Moran Family of Painters: Edward, Leon, Thomas, Mary & Peter Moran" mort en 1952

1862 births
1935 deaths
Artists from Philadelphia
National Academy of Design alumni
Pennsylvania Academy of the Fine Arts alumni